Vitaliy Prokopchenko (born 14 January 1983) is a Ukrainian former professional football forward.

Prokopchenko is a product of the FC Torpedo Zaporizhzhia football academy. He became noticeable during couple of seasons in the Ukrainian First League when he was among the top scorers playing for Feniks-Illichovsk and Tytan.

In 2003 he tried unsuccessfully to sign with FC Dinamo Minsk in Belarus. After relegation of FC Torpedo Zaporizhzhia in 2003, Prokopchenko was actively looking to return to professional football trying to sign with SC Olkom Melitopol that was coached by his former first coach Vyacheslav Tropinin.

References

External links
 
 

1983 births
Living people
Footballers from Zaporizhzhia
Ukrainian footballers
FC Torpedo Zaporizhzhia players
SSSOR Metalurh Zaporizhzhia players
FC Viktor Zaporizhzhia players
FC Yalos Yalta players
FC Tytan Armyansk players
FC Krymteplytsia Molodizhne players
FC Feniks-Illichovets Kalinine players
FC Hoverla Uzhhorod players
FC Oleksandriya players
FC Naftovyk-Ukrnafta Okhtyrka players
FC Tavria-Skif Rozdol players
Association football forwards